The Curse of the Jade Scorpion is a 2001 American crime comedy film written, directed and starring Woody Allen. The cast also features Helen Hunt, Dan Aykroyd, Elizabeth Berkley, John Schuck, Wallace Shawn, David Ogden Stiers and Charlize Theron. The plot concerns an insurance investigator and an efficiency expert who are both hypnotized by a crooked hypnotist into stealing jewels.

The Curse of the Jade Scorpion received mixed reviews from critics and was a commercial failure.

Plot 

In 1940, C.W. Briggs is an insurance investigator in New York City who is highly successful, owing to his many connections and ability to think like a criminal. His work does not impress Betty Ann Fitzgerald, an efficiency expert who butts heads with C.W. over his old-fashioned views. Her advice is usually followed, however, because she secretly is in a relationship with her boss, Chris Magruder, who constantly reassures her that they will be free to pursue their relationship in public once he finalizes his divorce with his wife.

While attending a dinner with some employees, Voltan, a stage magician calls on Betty Ann and C.W. to be in his hypnotism act. Using the words "Madagascar" and "Constantinople" on them, respectively, as trigger words to put them in a trance, the two are given the suggestion that they are newlyweds who are madly in love before being reawakened. When C.W. returns home for the evening, he receives a call from Voltan, who uses C.W.'s trigger word to put him back in a trance and orders him to steal jewels for him. C.W. has no recollections of these crimes after he is woken up and is determined to prove himself by solving the crimes. He starts investigating Betty Ann on the grounds of her suspicious behavior (actually related to her affair with Chris) and sneaks into her house one evening. There, he witnesses Chris telling her that he has reconciled with his wife and will not have a divorce. When Magruder leaves, Betty Ann becomes drunk in a fit of depression and tries to jump out of a window. C.W. stops her and spends the night keeping her from other self-destructive activities.

Eventually, investigations start picking up evidence pointing to C.W., leading to his arrest. He manages to escape to Betty Ann's place, where she grudgingly hides him. Thinking that C.W. is no longer available, Voltan calls Betty Ann, using her trigger word of "Madagascar" to put her in a hypnotic state and steal for him. On her return, still in a trance, the subliminal suggestion of being in love leads her to seduce C.W. Eventually his co-workers and friends George Bond and Alvin "Al" recall the initial hypnotism and realize that it is the cause of the robberies. George, an amateur magician, frees C.W. of the trigger word and restores his memories. C.W. realizes what has happened and goes back to Betty Ann's apartment to find her missing. He then realizes that she must have been hypnotized again and manages to locate the site where the still-hypnotized Betty Ann is delivering the jewels to Voltan. Voltan discovers C.W. and holds him at gunpoint. However, C.W. deduces that a small-time criminal like Voltan would not have the nerve to do something as drastic as murder. Voltan tries escaping, but the police catch him shortly after. The still-hypnotized Betty Ann expresses her love for C.W. who takes advantage of her state to passionately kiss her before erasing her memories of the event.

Back at work, the employees talk about Betty Ann and Chris going on a romantic getaway. C.W. goes to Chris to inform him of his resignation. An apologetic Chris understands and lets him know that if C.W. leaves, the company will give him his blessing and if he stays, Chris will give him a raise. He also promises C.W. that if he stays, he will make sure that Betty Ann will no longer interfere with his work, letting him know that he intends on forcing her to retire after they get married, as he does not want his wife to be working with him. This visibly disturbs C.W., who then heads to Betty Ann's office to let her know of his resignation and say goodbye. The two have a parting drink during which Betty Ann playfully insults C.W. a few more times and he expresses his amazement that an intelligent woman like Betty Ann would be with Chris, stating that she refuses to be vulnerable even at the price of finding true love and happiness. Outside, Al says that he will quit if C.W. does, and the rest of the staff hail him as a hero. C.W. dismisses his success as luck. When Al notes that hypnotism can make people do things that they do not want to do, George reveals that a hypnotised person would not do anything that they would not when in a normal state, leading everyone to realize that both C.W. and Betty Ann have secret criminal instincts. Al then privately gets C.W. to admit that he loves Betty Ann. At Al's urging, C.W. decides to go after Betty Ann, who is about to leave for Paris with Chris. C.W. proceeds to propose to Betty Ann, confess his love for her, and convince her that she loves him, too. She repeatedly rejects and insults C.W. while Chris tries to get C.W. to leave. As Betty Ann and Chris are about to leave, a desperate C.W. uses her trigger word to hypnotize Betty Ann. Betty Ann, who is now in an amorous state, dreamily tells Chris that she is staying with C.W. and announces that the two are getting married, confessing to C.W. that she fell in love with him the moment that they met. A frantic Chris runs to stop his divorce while Al presents C.W. with the jade scorpion as a gift. C.W. and Betty Ann decide to go to her apartment to have sex. As they are leaving, Al notes that it was lucky that George forgot to deprogram Betty Ann, but George reveals that he had done that the night before. Meanwhile, Betty Ann continues to gush out her love for C.W., and C.W. promises her that he will be able to make her love him for real. Betty Ann notes that anything is possible, pointing out that she was able to make C.W. fall in love with her without using his trigger word. At that moment, he realizes that Betty Ann is no longer hypnotized and finds her grinning knowingly. Understanding that she is going with him willingly, the two head off with Betty Ann putting her arm around him.

Cast

Critical reception
The film received mixed reviews from critics. Metacritic gives the film an average score of 52 out of 100, based on 31 critics, indicating "mixed or average reviews".

Allen himself seems to be in relative agreement with some critics, remarking that it is perhaps his worst movie. Allen has said he felt he let down the rest of the cast by casting himself as the lead. He explained that part of the problem was the period setting and the set building expense which made it too expensive to go back and re-shoot anything. Allen re-shot the entirety of his 1987 drama September after he felt he got the casting wrong. Allen remarked he offered the role of C.W. Briggs to both Jack Nicholson and Tom Hanks, but had to take it when both refused.

With its production budget of $33 million, it is Allen's most expensive film. In relation to most of his most successful productions, the film fared poorly in American theaters with ticket sales of over seven million dollars. Its worldwide gross was $18.9 million. However, in the ten years since its release, it is beginning to enjoy a new generation of cult status comedic recognition. Roger Ebert wrote, "There are pleasures in the film that have little to do with the story. Its look and feel is uncanny; it's a tribute to a black-and-white era, filmed in color, and yet the colors seem burnished and aged. No noir films were shot in color in the 1940s, but if one had been, it would have looked like this. And great attention is given to the women played by Hunt, Berkley and Theron; they look not so much like the women in classic film noir as like the women on film noir posters—their costumes and styles elevate them into archetypes. Hunt in particular has fun with a wisecracking dame role that owes something, perhaps, to Rosalind Russell in His Girl Friday."

Tribute
French singer-songwriter Dimie Cat pays a tribute to the film in the song "Woody Woody", from her album ZigZag.

Music 
The film features a variety of 1940s era music.

 "Sophisticated Lady" (Duke Ellington)
 "Two Sleepy People" (Hoagy Carmichael, Frank Loesser) – Earl 'Fatha' Hines
 "Tuxedo Junction" (Buddy Feyne, William Johnson, Julian Dash, Erskine Hawkins) – Dick Hyman & The Rainbow Room All Stars
 "How High the Moon" (Morgan Lewis, Nancy Hamilton) –  Dick Hyman & The Rainbow Room All Stars

 "In a Persian Market" (Albert W. Ketèlbey) – Wilbur De Paris
 "Flatbush Flanagan" (Harry James) – Harry James
 "Sunrise Serenade" (Frankie Carle, Jack Lawrence) – Glenn Miller

References

External links
 
 
 
 
 

2001 films
2001 comedy films
2000s American films
2000s crime comedy films
2000s English-language films
American crime comedy films
American detective films
DreamWorks Pictures films
Films about hypnosis
Films directed by Woody Allen
Films produced by Letty Aronson
Films set in 1940
Films shot in New Jersey
Films shot in New York City
Films with screenplays by Woody Allen